Eigenmannia cacuria is a species of glass knifefish from the upper rio Parnaíba in the northeast of Brazil.

Etymology
The species name of “cacuria” is in reference to the “cacuriá”, a typical dance in the state of Maranhão, Brazil where the holotype was collected.

References

Sternopygidae
Fish of Brazil
Taxa named by Guilherme Moreira Dutra
Taxa named by Telton Pedro Anselmo Ramos  
Taxa named by Naércio Aquino de Menezes
Fish described in 2022